The Youdan Football Cup, also known as the Youdan Cup, was an 1867 Sheffield rules football competition. Preceding the FA Cup by more than four years, it was among the first tournaments in any code of football.

Background

The competition took its name from a local theatre owner, Thomas Youdan, who sponsored the competition and provided the trophy.

Rules

On 28 January 1867, representatives of thirteen football clubs from the Sheffield area met at the Adelphi Hotel to form the "Youdan Prize Committee".  The committee drew up the following regulations to govern the tournament:

 Matches would be played under Sheffield Rules.
 Matches would start at three o'clock, with two umpires and one referee.
 There would be 12 players on each side.
 Games would last ninety minutes.  If the scores were tied, up to one hour of extra time would be played, with the first team to score during this period being declared the winner.  If scores were still tied after extra time, the match would be replayed.

After the first round, the committee added a new rule that "the referee shall have power to award a Free Kick to the opponents of any Club, which makes more than three fouls or kicks-out, when the ball is being thrown in, if he (the referee) considers those fouls or kicks-out to be intentional".

Participating teams

Format

The competition was organised as a straight knockout tournament, with two exceptions:

 Because twelve teams entered the tournament, there were three teams remaining after two rounds: one team, drawn at random, received a bye to the final, while the other two teams played a semi-final to determine the other finalist.
 After the final had been played, it was decided to hold a second-place playoff between the losing finalist and the losing semi-finalist.

The semi-final, final and second-place playoff were all held at Bramall Lane, which at the time was primarily a cricket ground.

Results

Under the Sheffield Rules of the time, the rouge was used as a tiebreaker if both teams scored an equal number of goals.

Of the thirteen matches played in the tournament, seven were goalless, of which six were decided by rouges.  Only one goal was scored after the first round.

In the results below, rouges are shown in brackets beneath the main scoreline.

First round

Second round

Replay

Semi-finals

Final

Second place play-off

Trophy

The Youdan Prize Committee invited members of the public to submit their proposed designs for the trophy.  The creator of the entry judged the best would be rewarded by Thomas Youdan with a prize of one sovereign.

This prize was initially awarded to a Mr Jarvis, of Roscoe Works. His design was subsequently combined with that of another entrant: Mr. Topham, engraver, who was awarded a further prize of one pound.

Before the semi-final, it was decided that the second-placed club would also be awarded a prize, to be funded by an admission fee of 3d at the semi-final and final.  This prize ended up being valued at £2 10s.

The trophies were presented at a dinner held at the Adelphi Hotel on Monday 11 March.  Because the winning design required "protracted time [...] in its manufacture", it had not been completed in time for the ceremony.  In its place, a "richly-ornamented claret jug", created by Martin, Hall, and Co., was awarded to Hallam.  Thomas Youdan was absent through illness, so the trophy was presented by Mr J. Birley to J. C. Shaw, Hallam's captain.  The second prize, a "double-handed goblet [...] enriched with athletic figures", was awarded to Norfolk.

The inscription on the cup awarded to Hallam reads: 
	
Shaw presented the trophy to the members of the Hallam Club at a dinner after the final match of their season, played at Sandygate on Saturday 16 March.
The first-place trophy was subsequently lost.  It did not resurface again until 1997, when a Scottish antiques collector contacted Hallam F.C. to tell them that he was in possession of it – they subsequently bought it back for £1,600. Since then it has been valued to be worth at least £100,000 by silver specialist Alastair Dickenson of the BBC programme Antiques Roadshow, although the owners have insisted it is not for sale.

Legacy
Attendances of up to 3,000 were reported in the press.  This would not be exceeded by the reported attendance at an FA Cup final until 1878.

Contemporary reports suggest that the 1867 tournament was expected to be repeated in subsequent years, with Youdan awarding a trophy of the original competition-winning design. This did not occur, and in the event the Cromwell Cup was held in 1868, sponsored and named after another Sheffield theatre owner. Youdan nevertheless maintained an interest in football, for example by donating £50 in prize money to the Sheffield Football Association in 1870.

The work of the ad-hoc Youdan Prize Committee in co-ordinating activity between local clubs and framing rules was a precursor to that of the Sheffield Football Association, which had already been formed by the end of January 1867, and issued its own first set of rules on 6 March 1867, the day following the final of the Youdan Cup.

The Youdan Trophy, a Sheffield-based international youth team tournament founded in 2014, takes its name from the Youdan Cup.

Notes

References

Sources 
 

Sport in Sheffield
Defunct football cup competitions in England
1867 establishments in England
Defunct football competitions in South Yorkshire
1866–67 in English football